Greig Street Bridge is a footbridge across the River Ness located in Inverness, Scotland. It is a suspension bridge built in 1880–1 by the civil engineer C. Manners in conjunction with the Rose Street Foundry for a cost of £1,400.

The bridge has warren trusses with an additional railing for pedestrian safety. The cables were replaced in 1952, as were the anchorages in 1989.

An important rite of passage for young Invernesians involves getting a third of the way onto the bridge and jumping up and down in unison. This creates the famous Greig Street sine wave, to the delight of the perpetrators and the horror of tourists, giving it, and an identical bridge further upstream, the local nickname of "The Bouncy Bridge".

References

Bridges in Highland (council area)
Buildings and structures in Inverness
Category B listed buildings in Highland (council area)
Bridges completed in 1881
1881 establishments in Scotland